Sabīne Kadirova (born 24 July 1990) is a Latvian footballer who plays as a midfielder. She has been a member of the Latvia women's national team.

References

1990 births
Living people
Latvian women's footballers
Women's association football midfielders
FK Liepājas Metalurgs (women) players
Latvia women's youth international footballers
Latvia women's international footballers